The Xinjiang clique was a military faction that ruled Xinjiang during China's warlord era.  Unlike other cliques, its leaders were from outside the province.

History 
During the Xinhai Revolution in 1911, the Qing governor fled from Dihua (Ürümqi).  A band of Yunnanese led by Yang Zengxin quelled the rebellion and established himself as the provincial leader.  President Yuan Shikai recognized Yang as governor.  Yang was one of the few who supported Yuan's attempt to become emperor.  During the National Protection War, he purged officers who sympathized with the Yunnan clique's leader Cai E.  After Yuan's death, he recognized whichever government ruled in Beijing and maintained an isolationist and neutrality policy which kept Xinjiang away from the upheavals experienced in the rest of China.

Ma Fuxing and Ma Shaowu, both of them Hui Chinese, were members of the clique. They held military and political positions under Yang.

Yang held absolute power in the region and kept the keys to the radio station on him at all times. He read every message himself and got rid of any which he didn't like.

Yang's future deputy, Fan Yaonan, had been studying in Japan when he was appointed as military attache of Xinjiang by Li Yuanhong. Fan heavily disliked Yang's government policy of keeping the people ignorant and tried to bring in more progressive ideas to the region. Li Yuanhong hoped that Fan would eventually kill Yang and replace him as governor of Xinjiang. Aspiring for higher positions, Fan sped up the process and on July 7, 1928, days after Yang recognized the Nationalist (KMT) government in Nanjing, Fan shot Yang dead during a banquet at the Xinjiang Academy of Politics and Law. Also present at the banquet were Chinese officials along with the Soviet consul-general and his wife. The consul-general and his wife were able to escape.

Following Yang's assassination, Jin Shuren, Yang's second in command, had Fan and his coconspirators killed. After that, he declared himself the provincial governor and was quickly recognized by the KMT. Jin wholly mismanaged the province by causing high inflation, banning the hajj, and replacing local officials with Han officials. In 1931, the alienated Muslim majority rebelled against Jin. Gansu warlord Ma Zhongying of the Hui Ma clique invaded in support of the rebellion.  Soon various other groups rebelled against Jin, often fighting against each other including the breakaway First East Turkestan Republic.

Jin was deposed by mutineers in 1933 and was succeeded by Sheng Shicai.  Sheng was not a protégé of either Yang or Jin.  He was initially an officer under Guo Songling and defected with Guo to the Guominjun.  He was appointed by Nanjing to serve under Jin as late as 1930.  The war continued unabated with Nanjing unable to resolve the conflict.  Frustrated, Sheng turned to the Soviet Union in 1934.  With Soviet support, Ma Hushan was defeated in 1937.  Sheng turned Xinjiang into a Soviet protectorate and safe haven for the Chinese Communist Party.

With Nazi Germany's invasion of the Soviet Union in 1941, Sheng decided to rejoin the Kuomintang and expelled Soviet advisors and executed communists.  Chiang Kai-shek couldn't trust Sheng, who tried renegotiating with Joseph Stalin, so he deposed him and installed direct rule in 1944.  The new KMT administration then faced a rebellion that formed the Second East Turkestan Republic.

See also
Warlord era

References

Works Cited
 
 
 

Warlord cliques in Republican China
20th century in Xinjiang